Mount Tobaru or Mount Lolodai is located in the northern part of Halmahera island, west of Dukono volcano. Little is known about this volcano because of its remote location.

See also 

 List of volcanoes in Indonesia

References 
 

Volcanoes of Halmahera